Raymond Séguy (8 December 1929 – 21 March 2022) was a French Roman Catholic bishop.

Séguy was born in Rieupeyroux, Aveyron, France and was ordained to the priesthood in 1954. He served as bishop of the Roman Catholic Diocese of Gap, France from 1981 to 1987 and as bishop of the Roman Catholic Diocese of Autun, France, from 1987 until his retirement in 2006. He died on 21 March 2022 at the age of 92.

References

1929 births
2022 deaths
Bishops of Gap
Bishops of Autun
Pontifical Gregorian University alumni
20th-century French Roman Catholic bishops
21st-century French Roman Catholic bishops